João Francisco Bráz, also commonly known simply as Bráz (November 25, 1920 – September 11, 1996) was a Brazilian basketball player. Born in São Paulo, at his Olympic debut he won the bronze medal with Brazilian basketball team under the guidance of head coach Moacyr Daiuto.

References

External links
 profile
 Profile

1920 births
1996 deaths
Basketball players from São Paulo
Brazilian men's basketball players
Basketball players at the 1948 Summer Olympics
Basketball players at the 1952 Summer Olympics
Olympic bronze medalists for Brazil
Olympic basketball players of Brazil
Olympic medalists in basketball
Medalists at the 1948 Summer Olympics